Route 345 is a  long east–west secondary riverfront highway in the north-east portion of New Brunswick, Canada.

The route's eastern terminus is in the community of Upper Pokemouche. The road travels east, crossing the Pokemouche River, then Route 335, before entering the community of Evangeline. From there, the road passes Patricks Cove then continues to Inkerman Ferry ending at the intersection of Route 113.

Intersecting routes
Route 335

See also

References

345
345